Nufront Co., Ltd. is a Chinese fabless semiconductor company founded in 2004 that provides system-on-chip integrated circuits for tablets and smartphones.

Products

Processors

Other Chipsets

See also 
 Allwinner Technology
 HiSilicon
 InfoTM
 Leadcore Technology
 MediaTek
 Rockchip
 Spreadtrum

References

External links 
 

Companies based in Beijing
Fabless semiconductor companies
Semiconductor companies of China
Chinese brands